Shintomichō Station (新富町駅) is the name of two train stations in Japan:

Shintomichō Station (Tokyo)
 Shintomichō Station (Toyama)